Gunisao Lake Airport  is located adjacent to Gunisao Lake, Manitoba, Canada.

See also
Gunisao Lake Water Aerodrome

References

Registered aerodromes in Manitoba